Bhante (Pali; , ; Sanskrit: bhavantaḥ), sometimes also called Bhadanta, is a respectful title used to address Buddhist monks and superiors in the Theravada tradition.

The term religiously means "Venerable Sir."

Etymology
Bhante is a gender-neutral term, and may be used to address both monks and nuns. It is the vocative form of the word bhadanta, which confers recognition of greatness and respect. In English, the term is often translated as Venerable.
The Nepali terms bare and bande have the same derivation and are used to address Buddhist clergy. Bhante can also be used as an honorific or a form of address to specific Buddhist monks, similar to Ajahn, Phra or Luang Por in Thailand or Ashin in Burma (now Myanmar), Rinpoche in Tibet.

Some famous monks who are addressed with bhante include:
 Bhante K. Sri Dhammananda
 Bhante Dharmawara
 Bhante Henepola Gunaratana ("Bhante G.")
 Bhante Dhammalok Mahasthavir
 Bhante Kumar Kashyap Mahasthavir
 Bhante Pragyananda Mahasthavir
 Bhante Sitagu Sayadaw
 Bhante Vimalaramsi

Grammatically "bhante" is a vocative case form of a Pali word "bhadanta" (venerable, reverend). The vocative case denotes and is used for address.

In literature
The title bhante is used among monks to address superiors within the sangha. The Pali Canon abounds with references to the Buddha's disciples addressing their seniors in this way. While the Buddha is usually addressed with the term Bhagavān, his disciples also sometimes addressed him as Bhante.

See also
 Ayya
 Ajahn
 Anjali
 Awgatha
 Phra
 Sayadaw

References

Theravada
Buddhist titles